The Warrens of Virginia is a 1924 American silent drama film directed by Elmer Clifton. It was produced and distributed by Fox Film Corporation.

Plot
As described in a review in a film magazine, Burton (Lytell) and Agatha Warren (Mansfield) were childhood sweethearts and grew up together. At the start of the Civil War, Burton becomes a Lieutenant in the Union Army while all of Agatha’s family are on the other side. After four years of fighting, a situation arose where General Lee’s army was dependent upon the arrival of a supply train. The Union general, urging patriotism, persuades Burton to carry a false message when he goes to call on Agatha, arranging with a spy so that Burton would be captured by Confederate forces. The scheme works, the train is captured, and Lee surrenders to end the war. Furious at his perfidy, and considered as a spy, the Confederates led by Hill Buzzard take Burton out to be hanged. Agatha, although incensed at Burton, rides to get help. Burton is placed on his horse and a noose placed around his neck. The Confederates intend to drive his horse from under him, but the horse refuses to budge though severely beaten, giving time for the rescue party summoned by the heroine to arrived and save Burton. Five years later, Burton returns, Agatha forgives him, and they find happiness together.

Cast

Production
The film was shot in San Antonio, Texas. Brackenridge Park doubled as a battlefield at Appomattox.

Martha Mansfield was on the set when her period hoop dress caught fire, possibly from a discarded match. She died at a hospital the next day. Most of Mansfield's scenes had been shot, so production of the film continued.

Preservation
With no prints of The Warrens of Virginia located in any film archives, it is a lost film.

See also
The Warrens of Virginia (1915 film)

References

External links

1924 films
American silent feature films
1924 war films
1920s historical drama films
American historical drama films
American black-and-white films
American Civil War films
Films directed by Elmer Clifton
Films shot in San Antonio
Films shot in Texas
Films set in Virginia
American war drama films
Fox Film films
Lost American films
1924 drama films
1924 lost films
1920s American films
Silent American drama films
Silent war drama films
1920s war drama films